Lautaro Dante Geminiani (born 2 March 1991) is an Argentine professional footballer who plays as a right-back for Patronato.

Career
Geminiani began in the youth of Patronato, before spells with Boca Juniors and Quilmes. His career with Patronato's senior squad started in 2012. He made his professional debut on 7 December during a victory away to Independiente Rivadavia, one of two appearances in the 2012–13 Primera B Nacional campaign. He made sixty-eight appearances in his first four seasons with Patronato, which ended with promotion to the Argentine Primera División in 2015. Geminiani was sent off in his second Primera División match, on 14 February 2016 versus Gimnasia y Esgrima. Geminiani switched Patronato for Sarmiento in August 2019.

On 14 August 2020, following eight appearances for Verde, Geminiani completed a return to Patronato for a third spell with them.

Career statistics
.

References

External links

1991 births
Living people
People from Paraná, Entre Ríos
Argentine footballers
Association football defenders
Primera Nacional players
Argentine Primera División players
Club Atlético Patronato footballers
Club Atlético Sarmiento footballers
Sportspeople from Entre Ríos Province